Polypodium appalachianum is a fern species native to eastern North America.  Sometimes called the Appalachian polypody or Appalachian rockcap fern, it is very similar in appearance to Polypodium virginianum.  For years, P. virginianum—long considered a variety of the British Polypodium vulgare—was recognized as having cryptic races, with diploid, triploid, and tetraploid representatives.  Since the triploid specimens bore abortive spores, it was apparently the hybrid between the diploid and tetraploid groups.  In 1991, it was resolved that the type of P. virginianum was the tetraploid series, and that it is an allotetraploid species of hybrid origin, with the diploid species as one parent.  The diploid species was then named P. appalachianum.  The other parent of P. virginianum was found to be Polypodium sibiricum.  The tetraploid of hybrid derivation tolerates warmer climates than either parent.

Polypodium sibiricum is also now known to be one of the parents of the allotetraploid Polypodium vulgare, along with Polypodium glycyrrhiza.

P. appalachianum is an epipetric plant, preferring sandstone or other hard, noncalcareous rocks.  However, it is known to grow as an epiphyte in the Smoky Mountains. Throughout much of its range, it will be found to grow in places more sheltered from the sun and heat than is P. virginianum. Both species, and their hybrid, can form large clonal colonies, forming dense mats that hold organic matter in place on rock shelves and surfaces.

References

USDA Plants Profile of Polypodium appalachianum: 
Flora of North America entry for Polypodium appalachianum: 
Species citation: American Fern Journal volume 81, number 1, page 18, 1991. JStor reference: 
Polypodium appalachianum as epiphyte in the Smoky Mountains: American Fern Journal volume 93, number 1, pages 36–41, 2003. JStor reference:

External links

appalachianum
Ferns of the Americas
Ferns of the United States
Flora of Eastern Canada
Flora of the Eastern United States
Epiphytes
Plants described in 1991